The Hölderlinturm (English: Hölderlin's Tower) is a building located in Tübingen, Germany that served as the place of residence and death in the final years of poet Friedrich Hölderlin. He lived there from May 3, 1807 until his death in 1843. The building is located on the Neckar riverfront and is one of the most popularly known sites in Tübingen.

History 

The construction of the building traces back to the 13th century. The stone foundation originates from the medieval city wall that originally ran along the northern bank of the Neckar. Hölderlin was forcibly admitted by his family to the clinic of physician Johann Autenrieth on September 15, 1806. The 34-year-old master carpenter Ernst Friedrich Zimmer acquired the property in 1807. Hölderlin was released on May 3, 1807, around the same time as Zimmer's purchase, with a prognosis of incurable illness and three years to live ("höchstens noch drei Jahre").

Autenrieth, meanwhile, had encouraged Zimmer to take Hölderlin into his home, and, looking back on the situation, Zimmer wrote:

Ich besuchte Hölderlin im Klinikum und bedauerte ihn sehr, daß ein so schöner herrlicher Geist zu Grunde gehen soll. Da im Klinikum nichts weiter mit Hölderlin zu machen war, so machte der Kanzler Autenrit mir den Vorschlag Hölderlin in mein Haus aufzunehmen, er wüßte kein passenderes Lokal.

"I visited Hölderlin in the clinic and felt very sorry for him, that such a beautiful, splendid spirit should perish. Because there was nothing more to be done with Hölderlin in the clinic, Autenrit suggested to me to admit Hölderlin into my home, since he could not think of a more appropriate place."

Hölderlin moved into the first floor of Zimmer's residence the day after his release and lived there until his death in 1843. During Hölderlin's tower period, he often wrote under the pseudonym Scardanelli. He also received visitors from the neighboring Tübinger Stift, the school Hölderlin himself had once attended. A visit to the ailing Hölderlin by Eduard Mörike and Wilhelm Waiblinger,  both known for their relationship to Hölderlin, is documented by Hermann Hesse in his 1914 short story "Im Presselschen Gartenhaus" ("In Pressel's Garden-House").

The building has since been extensively renovated and is now the seat of the Hölderlin Society (Hölderlin-Gesellschaft).

See also 

 Neckarfront

References

Further reading 
 Wilfried Setzler: Tübingen. Auf alten Wegen Neues entdecken. Ein Stadtführer. 2. Auflage. Verlag Schwäbisches Tagblatt, Tübingen 1998, .
 Imre Török: Butterseelen. Mit Hölderlin und Hermann Hesse in Tübingen. Windhueter, Stuttgart 1980,  (Erzählung).

Buildings and structures in Tübingen
Friedrich Hölderlin
Tourist attractions in Tübingen